Richard Sparry (c. 1530 – 1602), of Totnes and Staverton, Devon, was an English politician.

He was a Member (MP) of the Parliament of England for Totnes in 1593.

References

1530 births
1602 deaths
People from South Hams (district)
Members of the Parliament of England (pre-1707) for Totnes
English MPs 1593